Richard Hardwick (born 31 May 1994) is an Australian professional rugby union footballer. His usual position is flanker.

Early life

Hardwick was born in Namibia, but raised in Western Australia. He attended Churchlands Senior High School in Perth and was selected for the Australia 'A' Schoolboys team in 2011. Hardwick earned his stripes playing for University of Western Australia in the local Premier Grade competition. He previously played in the Juniors for UWA. In addition he spent two years with the Future Force squad preparing to become a Super Rugby player.

Rugby career

He made two starts and two  substitute appearances during the season.

Hardwick won the Phil Waugh Medal in the grand final of the 2016 National Rugby Championship for his man of the match performance on the way to Perth Spirit's first NRC title win.

Hardwick signed a two-year deal which will take him through the 2019 World Cup.

Super Rugby statistics

References

1994 births
Living people
Australian rugby union players
Australia international rugby union players
Rugby union flankers
Western Force players
Perth Spirit players
Namibian emigrants to Australia
Melbourne Rebels players
Melbourne Rising players
Rugby union players from Windhoek
Namibian rugby union players
Namibia international rugby union players